The 1995 Socialist Party presidential primary was the selection process by which members of the Socialist Party of France chose their candidate for the 1995 French presidential election.

Lionel Jospin won the primary by a huge margin. He later lost the presidential election to conservative candidate Jacques Chirac on 7 May 1995, obtaining 47% of the vote in the runoff.

See also 
 1995 French presidential election

References 

Socialist Party (France)
1995 elections in France
Primary elections in France